Neican (abbreviated from nèibù cānkǎo zīliào (内部参考资料), lit. "internal reference reports" or "internal reference materials") are internal reports of limited circulation prepared for the high-ranking Chinese Communist Party (CCP) officials. 

According to censorship rules in China, any matter that media outlets believe would harm the image of the CCP or Chinese government, threaten social stability and unity, or other matters not suitable for open publication, such as corruption, social unrest, and large-scale business swindles, should be reported internally rather than publicly. The neican also serve to keep CCP leaders informed about the issues that are seen as too sensitive be reported and discussed in the mainstream media. Thus they are supposed to offer more realistic and less censored version of events. They are often similar in form to investigative reporting, and are prepared by the journalists working for the official CCP organs such as Xinhua News Service or People’s Daily. As such, much of the information collected by the Chinese mainstream media is published in neican, not in the public outlets.

The popularity of neican has been on the rise in recent years, with some estimates suggesting a several-fold increase in the last decade from 2000. Some lower-level neican have become profit centers for their publishers (such as ministries), which try to increase their subscription base.

Sometimes, the term neican is used to refer to restricted literature (books available only to individuals with certain clearances).

Criticism

Neican have been criticized for being slow and inefficient. Often, they focus on information already available in the Internet, but not in the Chinese traditional printed mainstream media, which is both censored by the government, and in which self-censorship of sensitive items is heavily encouraged. They are also seen as biased (produced by CCP members for other party members), often saying what the writers expect the superiors want to hear, and downplaying or omitting unpleasant news. As Hu Xingdou, a professor of social science at the Beijing Institute of Technology, notes: "[...] there are some issues that even neican won't touch", for example, military affairs and high-level corruption.

See also
Internal media of the Chinese Communist Party
Tipao

References

Mass media in China
Government of China